Route 341 is a Quebec provincial highway located in the Lanaudière region northeast of Montreal. It runs from south to north from Repentigny just south of the junction of Autoroute 40 and ends 55 kilometers north at the junction of Route 125 northwest of Rawdon, Quebec. It overlaps Route 337 and Route 348 in Rawdon and Route 346 east of Sainte-Julienne.

Municipalities along Route 341

 Repentigny
 L'Assomption
 L'Épiphanie
 Saint-Jacques
 Sainte-Julienne
 Rawson
 Chertsey

See also
 List of Quebec provincial highways

References

External links
 Official Transport Quebec Map Network 
 Route 341 on Google Maps

341